The 1962 North Rhine-Westphalia state election was held on 8 July 1962 to elect the 5th Landtag of North Rhine-Westphalia. The outgoing government was a majority of the Christian Democratic Union (CDU) led by Minister-President Franz Meyers.

The CDU lost its majority with a decline of four percentage points to 46%, but remained the largest party by a small margin. The opposition Social Democratic Party (SPD) saw a corresponding gain of four points and won 43%. The Free Democratic Party (FDP) remained steady on 7%. The CDU subsequently formed a coalition with the FDP, and Franz Meyers continued as Minister-President.

Electoral system
The Landtag was elected via mixed-member proportional representation and had a term of four years. 150 members were elected in single-member constituencies via first-past-the-post voting, and fifty then allocated using compensatory proportional representation. A single ballot was used for both. An electoral threshold of 5% of valid votes is applied to the Landtag; parties that fall below this threshold are ineligible to receive seats. Overhang seats were not compensated.

Background
In the previous election held on 6 July 1958, the CDU won a landslide victory and took an absolute majority of both votes and seats. The SPD also achieved a swing in its favour, while the FDP and other minors parties suffered losses. The outgoing SPD-led coalition lost its majority and was replaced by a majority government of the CDU led by Franz Meyers.

Parties

Results

External links

References

Elections in North Rhine-Westphalia
1962 elections in Germany